Hashvid may refer to:
 Hashvid, Azna, Iran
 Hashvid, Dorud, Iran